Fighille is a frazione of the comune of Citerna in the Province of Perugia, Umbria, central Italy. It stands at an elevation of 321 metres above sea level. At the time of the Istat census of 2001 it had 421 inhabitants.

References 

Frazioni of the Province of Perugia